Kisbabot is a village in Győr-Moson-Sopron county, Hungary.

In 1534 King Ferdinand I donated the village to Count György Cseszneky. In 1592 Count János Cseszneky was its lord with other Cseszneky heirs, in 1611 István Darkó, Count Márton Cseszneky, Tamás Babothy  and Farkas Hegyi were the owners of Kisbabot.

External links 
 Street map 

Populated places in Győr-Moson-Sopron County